Mauro Picone (2 May 1885 – 11 April 1977) was an Italian mathematician. He is known for the Picone identity, the Sturm-Picone comparison theorem and being the founder of the Istituto per le Applicazioni del Calcolo, presently named after him, the first applied mathematics institute ever founded. He was also an outstanding teacher of mathematical analysis: some of the best Italian mathematicians were among his pupils.

Work

Research activity

Teaching activity
Notable students:

Luigi Amerio
Renato Caccioppoli
Gianfranco Cimmino
Ennio de Giorgi
Gaetano Fichera
Carlo Miranda

Selected publications
, (Review of the 2nd part of volume I) (available from the "Edizione Nazionale Mathematica Italiana").

See also
Renato Caccioppoli
Lamberto Cesari
Ennio de Giorgi
Gaetano Fichera
Picone identity
Antonio Signorini
Sturm-Picone comparison theorem

Notes

References

Biographical references
. The "Yearbook" of the renowned Italian scientific institution, including an historical sketch of its history, the list of all past and present members as well as a wealth of information about its academic and scientific activities.
. The brief "participating address" presented to the International congress on the occasion of the celebration of the centenary of birth of Mauro Picone and Leonida Tonelli (held in Rome on May 6–9, 1985) by Luigi Amerio on behalf of the Accademia Nazionale delle Scienze detta dei XL and of the Istituto Lombardo di Scienze e Lettere.
. The brief "participating address" presented to the International congress on the occasion of the celebration of the centenary of birth of Mauro Picone and Leonida Tonelli (held in Rome on May 6–9, 1985) by Pietro Buzano on behalf of the Polytechnic University of Turin: it includes also a short but precise description of the academic career of Picone.
. The "participating address" presented to the International congress on the occasion of the celebration of the centenary of birth of Mauro Picone and Leonida Tonelli (held in Rome on May 6–9, 1985) by Carlo Ciliberto on behalf of the University of Naples Federico II and of the Società Nazionale di Scienze, Lettere ed Arti di Napoli, describing briefly but comprehensively his activity in Napoli as a professor and the events leading to the founding of the Istituto Nazionale per le Applicazioni del Calcolo.
. The "participating address" presented to the International congress on the occasion of the celebration of the centenary of birth of Mauro Picone and Leonida Tonelli (held in Rome on May 6–9, 1985) by Gianfranco Cimmino on behalf of the Accademia delle Scienze dell'Istituto di Bologna.
. The chapter on Picone in a book collecting brief biographical sketches and bibliographies of the scientific works produced by the mathematicians who taught at the Parthenope University of Naples during their stay.
. The commemoration of Mauro Picone by Gaetano Fichera, one of his "allievi".
. An English translation of the title reads as:"Mauro Picone, a pioneer of modern analysis". Fichera's historical conference on the work and personality of his master, pronounced during the International congress in occasion of the celebration of the centenary of birth of Mauro Picone and Leonida Tonelli, held in Rome at the Accademia Nazionale dei Lincei on the days between 6 and 9 May 1985.
. "Mauro Picone and the Istituto Nazionale per le Applicazioni del Calcolo" is a brief historical survey of Picone's role in the founding of the Istituto Nazionale per le Applicazioni del Calcolo: the Author is one of his pupils, former workers and then director of the institute. It was presented at the International congress in occasion of the celebration of the centenary of birth of Mauro Picone and Leonida Tonelli (held in Rome on May 6–9, 1985): an English translation of the title of the conference is:-The work of Leonida Tonelli and his influence on scientific thinking in this century.
. The "participating address" presented to the International congress on the occasion of the celebration of the centenary of birth of Mauro Picone and Leonida Tonelli (held in Rome on May 6–9, 1985) by Antonio Hélio Guerra Vieira on behalf of the University of São Paulo, including the posthumous award of the Laurea honoris causa to Picone.
. The "participating address" presented to the International congress on the occasion of the celebration of the centenary of birth of Mauro Picone and Leonida Tonelli (held in Rome on May 6–9, 1985) by András Kósa on behalf of the University of Budapest.
. The personal recollections of András Kósa on Gaetano Fichera and Mauro Picone.
. The "participating address" presented to the International congress on the occasion of the celebration of the centenary of birth of Mauro Picone and Leonida Tonelli (held in Rome on May 6–9, 1985) by Mario Marino on behalf of the University of Catania, describing his teaching and research activity in Catania.
. The "participating address" presented to the International congress on the occasion of the celebration of the centenary of birth of Mauro Picone and Leonida Tonelli (held in Rome on May 6–9, 1985) by Benedetto Pettineo as the president of the Circolo Matematico di Palermo.
. The biographical and bibliographical entry (updated up to 1976) on Mauro Picone, published under the auspices of the Accademia dei Lincei in a book collecting many profiles of its living members up to 1976.
. The "participating address" presented to the International congress on the occasion of the celebration of the centenary of birth of Mauro Picone and Leonida Tonelli (held in Rome on May 6–9, 1985) by Antonio Rubeti on behalf of the Sapienza University of Rome.
. The "participating address" presented to the International congress on the occasion of the celebration of the centenary of birth of Mauro Picone and Leonida Tonelli (held in Rome on May 6–9, 1985) by Giovanni Schippa on behalf of the Università degli Studi dell'Aquila.
. The "participating address" presented to the International congress on the occasion of the celebration of the centenary of birth of Mauro Picone and Leonida Tonelli (held in Rome on May 6–9, 1985) by Radu Voinea as the president of the Romanian Academy of Sciences.
Mauro Picone at the Italian Wikipedia

Scientific references
. 
. Fichera's "last lesson" of the course of higher analysis, given on the occasion of his retirement from university teaching in 1992.
.
. The proceedings of the International congress on the occasion of the celebration of the centenary of birth of Mauro Picone and Leonida Tonelli, held in Rome on May 6–9, 1985, at the Accademia Nazionale dei Lincei.
.

External links

. The entry about Mauro Picone at the Edizione Nazionale Matematica Italiana.

Istituto per le Applicazioni del Calcolo "Mauro Picone": the institute he founded in 1922.

1885 births
1977 deaths
20th-century Italian mathematicians
Mathematical analysts
PDE theorists
Mathematicians from Sicily
Members of the Lincean Academy
Academic staff of the University of Catania
Academic staff of the University of Cagliari
Academic staff of the University of Naples Federico II